Schwarza may refer to several places and rivers in Germany and Austria:

Schwarza (Black Forest), a river of Baden-Württemberg, Germany, tributary of the Schlücht
Schwarza (Hasel), a river of Thuringia, Germany, tributary of the Hasel
Schwarza (Ilm), a river of Thuringia, Germany, tributary of the Ilm
Schwarza (Saale), a river of Thuringia, Germany, tributary of the Saale
Schwarza (Leitha), a river of Austria, tributary of the Leitha
Schwarza, part of Rudolstadt, Germany
Schwarza, Thuringia, a municipality near Meiningen, Thuringia, Germany